Bibingka commonly refers to a type of baked rice cake from the Philippines that is traditionally cooked in a terracotta oven lined with banana leaves and is usually eaten for breakfast or as merienda (mid-afternoon snack) especially during the Christmas season.

It can also be used as a general term referring to other Filipino baked rice cakes products, for example, those made with cassava flour (bibingkang cassava / bibingkang kamoteng kahoy), glutinous rice (bibingkang malagkit), or plain flour.

Bibingka is also found in East Timor and Christian communities in eastern Indonesia.

Origins

The shared origins of bibingka from the Philippines and Indonesia is widely acknowledged especially given that the Indonesian bibingka is from Eastern Indonesia, the regions closest to the Philippines with the most closely related cultures.

Some authors have also proposed a connection between the Goan dessert bebinca (or bibik) and the Southeast Asian bibingka due to the similarity in names. They believe that the Portuguese may have introduced it to Southeast Asia from Goa. This is unlikely, however, given that the Philippines, where bibingka is most widely known, was never a colony of Portugal. The preparations of the dish are also very different; the Goan dessert is a type of layered coconut pudding similar to Filipino sapin-sapin and Indonesian kue lapis, meanwhile the Filipino bibingka is a baked glutinous rice cake. The only similarity to the two dishes is that bebinca and bibingka both use coconut milk.  Rice-based dishes are also far more diverse in Southeast Asia, where rice is an ancient Austronesian staple crop.

Thus it is more likely that the Portuguese introduced the term to Goa from the Philippines, rather than the other way around. Similar to how the art of windowpane oyster shell windows were also introduced from the Philippines to Goa (they are still called capiz in Goa after the Philippine province of Capiz).

Linguist Blust attributes the word 'bibingka' as a possible Malay loan attributing a similar dish called Kue bingka.

In the Philippines
Bibingka is a traditional Philippine Christmas food. It is usually eaten along with puto bumbóng as a snack after attending the nine-day Simbang Gabi ('Night mass', the Filipino version of Misa de Gallo) and, therefore, it is commonly found sold near the vicinity of churches. In Baliwag and San Miguel, Bulacan, bibingka is sold along with a complimentary serving of fresh salabat.

As of October 9, 2007, the town of Dingras, Ilocos Norte in the Philippines is expecting a Guinness World Records certification after baking a kilometer-long cassava bibingka made from 1,000 kilos of cassava and eaten by 1,000 residents.

Preparation

The traditional recipe for bibingka calls for glutinous rice to be soaked in water overnight in tapayan jars to allow it to ferment with the addition of wild yeast called bubod or  tuba palm wine. The soaked and fermented rice is then ground into a smooth and viscous batter called galapong through the use of a millstone or gilingang bato.  This method makes use of the fermentation to produce the leavening agent for the rice cake and also to provide a characteristic faint fermented aftertaste to the resulting product. With the time-consuming process of the traditional preparation, modern versions sometimes use regular rice flour or Japanese mochiko flour in place of galapong. Other ingredients can also vary greatly, but the most common secondary ingredients are eggs and milk.

In cooking the bibingka, a shallow terra cotta bowl is lined with a single large section of a banana leaf. The bowl is then placed over preheated coals and the rice flour and water mixture is poured into the banana leaf liner, taking care not to spill it out directly into the bowl itself. 
Sliced salted egg and cheese are then added on top of the batter;  uncommon toppings can include pinipig (pounded immature rice grains), chocolate, fruit preserves/jams, and pineapple. A mixture of two or more of these toppings on a single bibingka are also common and sometimes called bibingka especial.

Another piece of banana leaf is added to the top and the container is then covered with a flat metal sheet holding more preheated coals. The end result is a soft and spongy large flat cake that is slightly charred on both surfaces and infused with the unique aroma of toasted banana leaves. Additional toppings are then added, usually consisting of butter/margarine, sugar, cheese, or grated coconut.

More modern preparation of the dessert makes use of metal cake pans and purpose-built multi-tiered standing electric ovens. The resulting product from this method of preparation lacks the distinctive smoky smell of charcoal but is otherwise the same with regards on taste and texture, especially if banana leaves are used to line the cake pans. Mass-produced bibingka in Philippine bakeries are also made using characteristic tin molds that give them a crenulated edge similar to large puto or puto mamon (cupcakes).

Taste and texture
Bibingka has a texture ranging from a soft spongy texture similar to puto, another Philippine rice cake, to a soft but firm texture. It is eaten hot or warm and is slightly sweet with a taste very similar to rice pudding. The top and bottom surfaces (including the traditional banana leaf lining) are also usually charred, adding to the flavor. The regular size of bibingka can be sliced or torn into several wedges and is enough to serve 3 to 4 people while some establishments also offer smaller-sized bibingka for individual consumption.

Variants
Bibingka is also used as a general term for desserts made with flour and baked in the same manner. The term can be loosely translated to "[rice] cake". It originally referred primarily to bibingka galapong, the most common type of bibingka made with rice flour. Other native Philippine cakes have also sometimes been called bibingka. These may use other kinds of flour, such as corn flour, cassava flour, or plain flour, and are usually considered separate dishes altogether. Some variations of bibingka differ only from the type of toppings they use. The common types of bibingka are listed below:

 Bibingka galapóng is the traditional form of bibingka made from ground soaked glutinous rice (galapóng), water, and coconut milk.
 Bibingkang malagkít is a moist version of bibingka, typically served sliced into square blocks. It commonly also includes slices of ripe jackfruit (langka) and topped with latik (coconut caramel) and grated coconut. It is very similar to biko, except that it is baked and uses galapong instead of whole grain.
 Bibingkang Mandaue (Mandaue-style Bibingka) are bibingka from Mandaue, Cebu. It is traditionally made with tubâ (palm wine) which gives it a slightly tart aftertaste. Nowadays, tubâ is often substituted with yeast.
Bibingkoy - a unique variant from Cavite which has a filling of sweetened mung beans and served with a sauce of coconut cream, jackfruit, and sago. It is very similar to mache, but is baked instead of steamed.
Buko bibingka - Bibingka baked with slivers of young coconut flesh (buko).
 Cassava cake is made from grated cassava (instead of rice), coconut milk, and condensed milk. It is the most similar to pudding in appearance. Also known as cassava bibingka or bibingkang kamoteng kahoy.
Cassava buko bibingka - a variant of cassava cake that adds young coconut (buko) to the recipe.
Pineapple cassava bibingka - a variant of cassava cake that adds crushed pineapple chunks.
Royal bibingka - a variant of cassava cake from Vigan, Ilocos Sur shaped like cupcakes with a cheese and margarine topping.
Durian bibingka - Bibingka baked with durian flesh. A specialty of the Davao Region in Mindanao.
Salukara, a pancake-like variant of bibingka from Eastern Samar. It also uses tubâ and is traditionally cooked in pans greased with pork lard.
Sinukat a type of bibingka baked in half of a coconut shell.

In Eastern Indonesia

Bibingka or bingka is also popular in Indonesia, particularly among Christian-majority areas in northern Sulawesi and the Maluku Islands, both of which were former colonies of the Portuguese Empire and are geographically close to the southern Philippines. It is prepared almost identically to Philippine bibingka. In the provinces of North Sulawesi and Gorontalo, bibingka is usually made with rice or cassava flour and coconut milk with shredded coconut baked inside. In the Maluku Islands, bibingka is spiced and sweetened with brown sugar or sweet meat floss. It is also traditionally cooked in clay pots lined with banana, pandan, or nipa leaves. As in the Philippines, it is also usually eaten during the Christmas season.

A pancake-like variant of bibingka was introduced to the Chinese Indonesian communities of East Java during the Dutch colonial period. Known as wingko, wiwingka, or bibika, it became popular throughout the island of Java.

Variants
 Bibingka kelapa or bibingka santan, Indonesian bibingka made from rice flour and coconut milk, topped with jackfruit or coconut
 Bibingka kelapa, Indonesian bibingka made from rice flour and coconut milk, topped with jackfruit or coconut
 Bibingka abon, made from rice flour and coconut milk, topped with meat floss
 Bibingka ubi telo, made from ube or cassava flour and coconut milk
 Bibingka nanas or wingko nanas, made from ube or cassava flour and coconut milk with pineapple

See also

 Tupig
 Espasol
 Kakanin
 Kalamay
 Kue
 Panyalam
 Puto
 Puto bumbong
 Sapin-sapin

References

External links

Christmas food
East Timorese cuisine
Kue
Indonesian rice dishes
Indonesian desserts
Javanese cuisine
Philippine rice dishes
Philippine desserts
Rice cakes